Dumbell Mountain is an  double summit massif located in the Glacier Peak Wilderness of the North Cascades, in Chelan County of Washington state. The Dumbell summit is slightly higher than the northeast subpeak (8,415 ft) which is unofficially called Greenwood Mountain. Its nearest higher neighbor is Chiwawa Mountain,  to the east-southeast. Precipitation runoff from Dumbell Mountain drains into tributaries of the Chelan River and the Wenatchee River. The mountain's descriptive name was applied by Albert Hale Sylvester (1871-1944), a pioneer surveyor, explorer, topographer, and forest supervisor in the Cascades.

Geology

The history of the formation of the Cascade Mountains dates back millions of years ago to the late Eocene Epoch. With the North American Plate overriding the Pacific Plate, episodes of volcanic igneous activity persisted. In addition, small fragments of the oceanic and continental lithosphere called terranes created the North Cascades about 50 million years ago.

During the Pleistocene period dating back over two million years ago, glaciation advancing and retreating repeatedly scoured and shaped the landscape. Uplift and faulting in combination with glaciation have been the dominant processes which have created the tall peaks and deep valleys of the North Cascades area.
Glacier Peak, a stratovolcano that is southwest of Dumbell Mountain, began forming in the mid-Pleistocene.

Climate
Dumbell Mountain is located in the marine west coast climate zone of western North America. Most weather fronts originate in the Pacific Ocean, and travel northeast toward the Cascade Mountains. As fronts approach the North Cascades, they are forced upward by the peaks of the Cascade Range, causing them to drop their moisture in the form of rain or snowfall onto the Cascades (Orographic lift). As a result, the west side of the North Cascades experiences high precipitation, especially during the winter months in the form of snowfall. Due to its temperate climate and proximity to the Pacific Ocean, areas west of the Cascade Crest very rarely experience temperatures below  or above . During winter months, weather is usually cloudy, but, due to high pressure systems over the Pacific Ocean that intensify during summer months, there is often little or no cloud cover during the summer. Because of maritime influence, snow tends to be wet and heavy, resulting in high avalanche danger.

See also

 Geography of the North Cascades
List of mountain peaks of Washington (state)

References

External links
 Weather forecast: Dumbell Mountain
 Dumbell Mountain: PBase aerial photo

Mountains of Washington (state)
Mountains of Chelan County, Washington
Cascade Range
North Cascades
North American 2000 m summits